The 2022 Michigan Secretary of State election was held on November 8, 2022, to elect the Secretary of State of Michigan. Incumbent Democrat Jocelyn Benson won reelection to a second term by a decisive margin, defeating Donald Trump-endorsed Republican Kristina Karamo by a 14 percentage point margin.

Background 
The position of Secretary of State of Michigan is responsible for overseeing elections in the state. Benson, a Democrat, was first elected to the position in 2018. Benson received national attention in her position following Joe Biden's victory in the state in the 2020 presidential election. Donald Trump's campaign contested Biden's victory in Michigan and filed a lawsuit over the counting of absentee ballots. 

The race for Michigan Secretary of State in 2022 has received national attention over its potential impact on how the state would oversee the 2024 presidential election there.

Democratic convention

Candidates

Nominee
Jocelyn Benson, incumbent secretary of state

Endorsements

Republican convention

Candidates

Nominee
Kristina Karamo, activist and educator

Eliminated at convention
Cindy Berry, Chesterfield Township clerk
Beau LaFave, member of the Michigan House of Representatives from the 108th district
Cathleen Postmus, Plainfield Township clerk

Declined
Ann Bollin, member of the Michigan House of Representatives from the 42nd district
Meghan Reckling, Livingston County Republican Party chair

Endorsements

General election

Predictions

Endorsements

Polling 
Graphical summary

Results

Notes

References

External links 
 Official campaign websites
 Jocelyn Benson (D) for Secretary of State
 Kristina Karamo (R) for Secretary of State

Secretary of State
Michigan
Michigan Secretary of State elections